Cracktrack Glacier is a glacier flowing west from the central Homerun Range into upper Tucker Glacier in the Admiralty Mountains, Victoria Land. The glacier provided an access route to Field Neve for R.H. Findlay's New Zealand Antarctic Research Program geological party during the 1981–82 season. It was so named because one of the motor toboggan tracks was torn badly here, requiring makeshift field repair.

References
 

Glaciers of Victoria Land
Borchgrevink Coast